Sultan's Great Day (March 22, 1981 – March 22, 2004) was a black American Saddlebred stallion sired by Supreme Sultan, out of the mare Supremes Cassandra.  Great Day, as he was commonly called, was a twice World's Champion Fine Harness Stallion.  In his debut performance, he earned the title 1983 2-year-old World's Champion fine harness stallion.  Other prestigious wins followed during his 2 and 3 year old years.  He was retired to stud at the age of 4, but was shown a few more times in later years.  Great Day was referred to as "one of the most prolific sires of world's champions throughout the 1990s". He sired 387 registered offspring of which 106 were ribbon winners, 63 were futurity ribbon winners, and 24 went on to become champions in their respective disciplines.

Early life and performance career
Sultan's Great Day 76479 was foaled March 22, 1981.  The breeder of record is Mrs. Hymel Fishkin of Gibsonia, Pennsylvania. His sire was Supreme Sultan, and his dam was the mare Supremes Casindra by Stonewall Supreme.  His haircoat was a deep black color, as were his mane and tail.

Great Day made his performance debut as a two-year-old competing in fine harness competition  He was sold after his title of champion to Donna Moore for Linda Johnson. Sultan was purchased by William Shatner after he won his second World's Championship Horse Show. He then started living at Belle Reve Farm.

Shatner commented on Sultan's Great Day, “Great Day is to me what a Rodin statue is to an art collector, except that this work of art is alive.”

Breeding and offspring

Sultan's Great Day became a breeding stallion at age 4 under the management and supervision of Donna Moore.  Among Donna's top breeding selections were daughters of New Yorker, a widely recognized sire of champion Saddlebreds.

During his breeding career, Sultan's Great Day sired 106 Kentucky State Fair World's Championship Horse Show ribbon winners with 454 ribbons (1st-8th), 24 champions, and 63 futurity ribbon winners.  The Kentucky State Fair World's Championship Horse Show is said to be the same "to saddlebreds in August what Churchill Downs is to thoroughbreds in May."

Pedigree
Sultan's Great Day's grandsire, Valley View Supreme is the only stallion ever to become Three Gaited World Grand Champion.

References 

Individual American Saddlebreds